CSLI may refer to:

 Center for the Study of Language and Information, a part of Stanford University
 Cell site location information, a component of mobile phone tracking
 CubeSat Launch Initiative